The following is a list of mummies that include Egyptian pharaohs and their named mummified family members. Some of these mummies have been found to be remarkably intact, while others have been damaged from tomb robbers and environmental conditions. It was not until Pharaoh Den of the first dynasty that things such as a staircase and architectural elements were added which provided better protection from the elements.

Identified

Disputed
The following entries are previously identified mummies that are now in dispute. Over time through the advance in technology, new information comes to light that discredits old findings and beliefs. The mummies that have been lost or destroyed since initial discovery may never be properly identified.

See also
List of bog bodies
List of pharaohs
Animal mummy
List of Theban tombs

Notes

References

Ancient Egyptian mummies
Mummies
Mummies
Mummies